The Hartle–Hawking state is a proposal in theoretical physics concerning the state of the Universe prior to the Planck epoch. It is named after James Hartle and Stephen Hawking.

Hartle and Hawking suggest that if we could travel backwards in time towards the beginning of the Universe, we would note that quite near what might otherwise have been the beginning, time gives way to space such that at first there is only space and no time. According to the Hartle–Hawking proposal, the Universe has no origin as we would understand it: the Universe was a singularity in both space and time, pre-Big Bang. However, Hawking does state "...the universe has not existed forever. Rather, the universe, and time itself, had a beginning in the Big Bang, about 15 billion years ago.", but that the Hartle–Hawking model is not the steady state Universe of Hoyle; it simply has no initial boundaries in time or space.

Technical explanation 

The Hartle–Hawking state is the wave function of the Universe—a notion meant to figure out how the Universe started—that is calculated from Feynman's path integral.

More precisely, it is a hypothetical vector in the Hilbert space of a theory of quantum gravity that describes this wave function.

It is a functional of the metric tensor defined at a (D − 1)-dimensional compact surface, the Universe, where D is the spacetime dimension. The precise form of the Hartle–Hawking state is the path integral over all D-dimensional geometries that have the required induced metric on their boundary. According to the theory, time, as it is currently observed, diverged from a three-state dimension after the Universe was in the age of the Planck time.

Such a wave function of the Universe can be shown to satisfy, approximately, the Wheeler–DeWitt equation.

See also 
 Imaginary time
 Multiple histories
 Signature change
 Universal wavefunction

Notes

References
 
 

Physical cosmology
Stephen Hawking